Jaime Castro Castro (28 March 1938) is a Colombian lawyer and politician, who served as Mayor of Bogotá from 1992 to 1994. A Liberal Party politician, he served as Minister of Government under President Belisario Betancur Cuartas, and as Minister of Justice under President Misael Pastrana Borrero.

References

1939 births
Living people
People from Moniquirá
Colombian Liberal Party politicians
Colombian Ministers of Government
Colombian Ministers of Justice
Members of the Senate of Colombia
Mayors of Bogotá
Ambassadors of Colombia to Italy